Gulmohar is a 2023 Indian Hindi-language drama film written and directed by Rahul V. Chittella. The film stars Sharmila Tagore, Manoj Bajpayee, Simran, Suraj Sharma and Amol Palekar. It was released on Disney+ Hotstar OTT platform on 3 March 2023.

Plot 
The Batra family has been living in a house named "Gulmohar" for many decades. As their Gulmohar villa is being brought down to give way to a high rise, the family meets up for one last party before the packers and movers take over. However, over the course of ghazal and gossip, the discordant notes in their relationships get exposed and one gets sucked into their tumultuous present and turbulent past. The postcards of memories are riddled with cryptic messages on the destiny.

Cast

 Sharmila Tagore as Kusum Batra
 Manoj Bajpayee as Arun Batra
 Simran as Indira "Indu" Batra 
 Suraj Sharma as Aditya "Adi" Batra 
 Amol Palekar as Sudhakar Batra
 Kaveri Seth as Divya Batra
 Utsavi Jha as Amrita Batra (Amu)
 Danish Sood as Ankur
 Anuraag Arora as Kamal Batra
 Devika Shahani as Neena Batra
 Sriharsh Sharma as Kishore Batra
 Santhy Balachandran as Reshma Saeed
 Jatin Goswami as Jeetendra "Jeetu" Kumar 
 Chandan Roy as Param
 Gandharv Dewan as Irfan
 Talat Aziz as Avinash
 Vinod Nagpal as Baba, Arun's birth father
 Tanvi Rao as Deepika
 Abhinav Bhattacharjee as Radheshyam
 Tripti Sahu as Surekha
 Nargis Nandal as Payal
 Varun Narayan as Sameer
 Kanishk Seth as Rocky
 Deepak Bagga as Suri
 Hiba Qamar as Young Kusum
 Meeta Narain as Supriya Palekar
 Sanjina Gadhvi as Young Supriya

Music 

The music for the film composed by Siddhartha Khosla & Alan Demoss and lyrics are written by Shellee.

Reception
Gulmohar generally received positive reviews. Critics praised the performances of Tagore, Bajpayee, and Simran. Saibal Chatterjee of NDTV gave the film giving 4 out of 5 stars and said that “there is a great deal of beauty in the muted melodrama”, praising the cast’s ensemble performance.

Alaka Sahani of The Indian Express drew a parallel between Gulmohar and Mira Nair's Monsoon Wedding and termed it as director Rahul V Chittella's Tribute to his mentor. 

Dhaval Roy, writing for the Times of India, gave the movie 3.5 stars and gave particular praise to the acting performance of the cast stating that Tagore “is par excellence” and that “while Manoj is outstanding, so is Simran as his wife, Indu. The duo's individual performances are as noteworthy as their on-screen chemistry as husband and wife”. He highlighted the “commendable performances” of the rest of the cast. 

Monika Rawal Kukreja of Hindustan Times was more critical. While she praised the cast’s performance she also stated that “the film needed much better editing” with certain subplots seeming “half-baked”.

References

External links

Star Studios films